Glynis Coles (born 20 February 1954), also known by her married name Glynis Coles-Bond, is a retired English professional tennis player and former British number 2.

Career
Coles played professionally between 1970 and 1988, playing both singles and doubles. Her best singles results in a Grand Slam tournament were at Wimbledon, where she advanced to the round of 16 in 1973 and 1975, losing both times to Margaret Court. As a doubles player, she reached the quarterfinals of many Grand Slam contests, most notably in 1975, when she and Sue Barker made the quarterfinals of all of the Grand Slam events in the same year. Coles won the women's singles title at the Swedish Open in 1973, and she and Barker won the women's doubles title there in 1974.

She made nine appearances for the British Fed Cup squad in 1974, 1975, and 1980.

WTA finals

Doubles (1 runner-up)

Performance timelines

" * " - Coles received a bye in the first round.
 " ^ " - Coles withdrew prior to the match, which is not counted as a loss.

Singles

Doubles

 1 - Coles received a walkover in the third round, which is not counted as a win.

Mixed doubles

See also
 Mildred Coles - Glynis's great-aunt, who competed at the 1908 Olympics in tennis

References

External links
 
 
 

Living people
1954 births
English female tennis players
Place of birth missing (living people)
British female tennis players